Ceresara is a comune (municipality) in the Province of Mantua in the Italian region Lombardy, located about  east of Milan and about  northwest of Mantua.

The municipality of Ceresara contains the frazioni (subdivisions, mainly villages and hamlets) San Martino Gusnago and Villa Cappella.

Ceresara borders the following municipalities: Casaloldo, Castel Goffredo, Gazoldo degli Ippoliti, Goito, Guidizzolo, Medole, Piubega, Rodigo.

Demographic evolution

References

External links
 www.comune.ceresara.mn.it/

Cities and towns in Lombardy